Al St. John (1893–1963) was an American comic actor who appeared in 394 films between 1913 and 1952. Starting at Mack Sennett's Keystone Film Company, St. John rose through the ranks to become one of the major comedy stars of the 1920s, though less than half of his starring roles still survive today. With the advent of sound drastically changing and curtailing the two-reel comedy format, St. John diversified, creating a second career for himself as a comic sidekick in Western films and ultimately developing the character of "Fuzzy Q. Jones", for which he is best known in posterity.

Starring St. John 

St. John's first starring roles were made at Keystone, but most of these were made at the very end of the history of the company, just as Mack Sennett was abandoning the "Keystone" moniker in order to extricate himself from the Triangle Film Corporation partnership. St. John got a second chance at solo stardom starting in 1919 with Paramount Pictures and the early Warner Bros. studio, and this led to extended series of 2-reel comedies for Fox Film Corporation and Educational Pictures. Al St. John starred in more than 70 2-reel comedies through 1932. This is the most important part of his personal legacy, but it remains the least accessible part of his activity. Changes to this list are inevitable, and are welcomed.

Fuzzy Q. Jones appearances 

"Fuzzy Q. Jones" was developed when Al St. John filled in for actor Fuzzy Knight on a film Knight was unable to make. St. John made more than 80 western films in this character, which proved indispensable to the PRC studio and so popular that "Fuzzy Settles Down" (1944) remains the only American B-Western that is titled after the sidekick. In post-war Germany, where Fuzzy was especially popular, he was always billed in the title of his pictures, despite the presence of the hero. It was as Fuzzy—whom Al came to regard as a separate person, apart from himself—that St. John finished out his long film career.
These films had, in many cases, multiple theatrical distributors, and most of the PRCs were re-released in the 1950s by Madison Pictures, though in some instances in cut down versions. In cases where a television vendor is the more likely medium through which one may see a given title, the vendor is listed in the distribution field is given rather than the original theatrical distributor. A listing for a home video does not automatically mean that the title is still available for viewing. All of these films were made in sound, and are extant.

With Roscoe Arbuckle and/or Buster Keaton 

Al St. John's association with his uncle, Roscoe "Fatty" Arbuckle, was central to his film career. Arbuckle first brought St. John to the Keystone set in 1913; over the years to follow, Arbuckle routinely employed St. John in playing rubes, rivals and other parts in support of his popular "Fatty" character. When Arbuckle left Keystone in early 1917 to form the Comique Comedy unit at Paramount, he and St. John were joined by stage comedian Buster Keaton, and the three created a singular cycle of silent comedies that exploited their matched acrobatic abilities and hard-driving capabilities in slapstick. This section represents onscreen appearances in films by St. John with either Arbuckle, Keaton or both, and it remains the most accessible area of Al St. John's silent comedy work. Arbuckle-directed comedies starring Al St. John are listed in the "Starring St. John" section above.

Supporting roles

Shorts 

Upon his arrival at Keystone, Al St. John was swiftly absorbed into the Keystone repertory company; he appeared in more 1914 films than Charlie Chaplin did. After Keystone, St. John appeared in support of other comics in 2-reelers up to the end of the silent era. Appearances in films with Roscoe Arbuckle are included in the list above. This list may be incomplete, as the full extent of St. John's appearances of this kind is not known, owing to so many lost films that may serve as possible candidates. For Keystones, the principal actor is included, though in many cases it is unclear who within the film that may be. Owing to the ensemble nature of many early Keystones, there are films which essentially do not have a central comedian as the fixture, and outside of Charlie Chaplin, survival rates on Keystones are less than what would be ideal. Unconfirmed appearances are not included in this list.

Features 

With the dawn of sound around 1930, Al St. John went from appearing almost exclusively in two-reel shorts to appearing almost exclusively in features. While his Fuzzy Q. Jones roles dominate St. John's feature output, he did appear in a number of features in other parts, mostly in Westerns. Some of these, particularly his serio-comic turn as "Uncle Billy" in The Outcasts of Poker Flat (1937), demonstrate a greater range of acting ability than the average Fuzzy Q. Jones role might suggest. Several parts listed here, however, are the tiniest of tiny bit roles.

See also 
 Al St. John

References

External links 
 
 Al St. John fan club on facebook
 Gold Medal Comedies Thread on Silent Comedians
 Al St. John Official YouTube Channel

Male actor filmographies
American filmographies